This is a list of Billboard magazine's Top Hot 100 songs of 1965. The Top 100, as revealed in the year-end edition of Billboard dated December 25, 1965, is based on Hot 100 charts from the issue dates of January 2 through October 30, 1965.

See also
1965 in music
List of Billboard Hot 100 number-one singles of 1965
List of Billboard Hot 100 top-ten singles in 1965

References

1965 record charts
Billboard charts